Chukwuebuka Onah (born 17 May 2000) is a Nigerian footballer who currently plays as a left back for Al Urooba on loan from Al-Nasr.

Career statistics

Club

Notes

References

2000 births
Living people
Nigerian footballers
Nigerian expatriate footballers
Association football fullbacks
Baladeyet El Mahalla SC players
Al Hammam SC players
Al-Nasr SC (Dubai) players
Al Urooba Club players
UAE Pro League players
Expatriate footballers in Egypt
Expatriate footballers in the United Arab Emirates
Nigerian expatriate sportspeople in Egypt
Nigerian expatriate sportspeople in the United Arab Emirates